Evie Lauren Isabel Rabjohn (born 28 April 2005) is an English footballer, who plays as a defender for Women's Super League club Aston Villa.

Career 
Rabjohn joined Aston Villa's academy as a student athlete, as part of a BTEC course with Sutton Coldfield College, where in 2022 she was named as "Sportswoman of the Year". 

On 17 November 2021, Rabjohn made her first team debut in the starting line-up of a 2–1 away defeat to Sheffield United in the Women's League Cup. She appeared on Aston Villa's substitute bench three times towards the end of the 2021–22 season. 

On 25 September 2022, Rabjohn made her league debut as an injury time substitute, replacing Rachel Daly in a 2–0 Women's Super League victory over Leicester City at King Power Stadium.

International career 
On 24 March 2022, Rabjohn made her debut for England U17s in a 2–1 defeat to France. She scored her first youth international goal on 30 March, in an 8–0 victory over Croatia.

On 30 September 2022, Rabjohn was selected for England U19s for their upcoming 2023 UEFA Women's Under-19 Championship qualification matches. She made her debut on 5 October, in a 5–0 victory over Slovenia.

Career statistics 
.

References

External links 

 

2005 births
Living people
English women's footballers
Women's Super League players
Aston Villa W.F.C. players
England women's youth international footballers
Women's association footballers not categorized by position